This is a list of all United States Supreme Court cases from volume 484 of the United States Reports:

External links

1987 in United States case law
1988 in United States case law